The 2015–16 UNLV Runnin' Rebels basketball team represented the University of Nevada, Las Vegas during the 2015–16 NCAA Division I men's basketball season. The Runnin' Rebels were led by fifth year head coach Dave Rice until he was fired on January 10, 2016. They were then led by interim head coach Todd Simon for the remainder of the season. They played their home games at the Thomas & Mack Center in Paradise, Nevada as members of the Mountain West Conference. They finished the season 18–15, 8–10 in Mountain West play to finish in a tie for sixth place. They defeated Air Force to advance to the quarterfinals of the Mountain West tournament where they lost to Fresno State.

On March 28, the school announced that Chris Beard had been hired as head coach. However, less than three weeks later, Beard left UNLV to accept the head coaching position at Texas Tech. On April 16, the school hired Marvin Menzies as head coach.

Previous season
The 2014–15 Runnin' Rebels finished the season with an overall record of 18–15, and 8–10 in conference play. The Runnin' Rebels defeated Nevada in the First round of the Mountain West tournament, before losing to San Diego State in the quarterfinals.

Departures

Incoming transfers

2015 recruiting class

Roster

Nov. 27, 2015 – Sophomore Goodluck Okonoboh asked for his release and will transfer.
Feb. 8, 2016 – Freshman Stephen Zimmerman Jr. out indefinitely due to a left knee injury. Returned Feb. 27 game against Wyoming.

* Ike Nwamu wore #0 until February 6 when he changed to #34 to honor former Mercer teammate Jibri Bryan who was murdered on February 2.

Schedule

|-
!colspan=9 style="background:#; color:white;"| Exhibition

|-
!colspan=9 style="background:#; color:white;"| Non-conference regular season

|-
!colspan=9 style="background:#; color:white;"| Mountain West regular season

|-
!colspan=9 style="background:#; color:#C10202;"| Mountain West tournament

References

UNLV
UNLV Runnin' Rebels basketball seasons
Run
Run